Short Wave on a Cold Day is the fifth album released by Kalamazoo-based progressive metal band Thought Industry. It was released in 2001 on Metal Blade Records.

Track listing
 Satan in the Gift Shop (Oberlin) 6:47
 I'm Lonely (and Grooving Like Cancer) (Oberlin) 4:00
 The Waitress in the Bar Orbiting Io (Oberlin) 4:18
 Burning Coal With Margaret (music: Baldwin/words: Oberlin) 3:55
 Tall Ships on the Rocks (Oberlin) 3:30
 Kiss Judy Fly (music: Roche/words: Oberlin) 3:09
 The Measure of our Miles (music: Roche/words: Oberlin) 3:59
 Lovers In Flames (music: Roche/words: Oberlin) 3:13
 A Week and Seven Days (music: Borkowski/words: Oberlin) 3:53
 Particle Hustler (Oberlin) 2:47
 Longfellow (music: Taylor/words: Oberlin) 4:01
 Hello, Murder (music: Roche/words: Oberlin) 4:44
 So Says Ike (Oberlin) 3:11
 Beautiful Coma (music: Roche/words: Oberlin) 4:16
 Interstellar Fix, 2056 (music: Roche/words: Oberlin) 6:13
 Alien and Pure (Oberlin) 4:53
 4:59

Personnel
Brent Oberlin - vocals, guitar
Mike Roche - guitar
Cameron Taylor - drums
Jeff Borkowski - guitar, keyboards
Mark Baldwin - bass guitar
Produced by Thought Industry

Thought Industry albums
2001 albums